Darreh-ye Hud (also Romanized as Darreh-ye Hūd; also known as Dar-e Hūd and Dar Hūk) is a village in Javar Rural District, in the Central District of Kuhbanan County, Kerman Province, Iran. At the 2006 census, its population was 23, in 8 families.

References 

Populated places in Kuhbanan County